Hispellinus minor, is a species of leaf beetle native to India, Sri Lanka and Sumatra.

References 

Cassidinae
Insects of Sri Lanka
Beetles described in 1919